The 1975–76 Edmonton Oilers season was the Oilers' fourth season of operation. The Oilers placed fourth to qualify for the playoffs, losing in the first round.

Offseason

Regular season

Final standings

Schedule and results

Playoffs

Winnipeg Jets 4, Edmonton Oilers 0 – Quarterfinals

Player statistics

Note: Pos = Position; GP = Games played; G = Goals; A = Assists; Pts = Points; +/- = plus/minus; PIM = Penalty minutes; PPG = Power-play goals; SHG = Short-handed goals; GWG = Game-winning goals
      MIN = Minutes played; W = Wins; L = Losses; T = Ties; GA = Goals-against; GAA = Goals-against average; SO = Shutouts;

Awards and records

Transactions

Draft picks
Edmonton's draft picks at the 1975 WHA Amateur Draft.

Farm teams

See also
1975–76 WHA season

References

External links

Ed
Ed
Edmonton Oilers seasons